Dean Fuller is a college men's ice hockey coach. Fuller had been the head coach of the program at Fitchburg State University since 1984, recording more than 500 wins in that time.

Career
Fuller played for the men's ice hockey team for four years, graduating in 1978 with a degree in special education. Fuller remained with the team as an assistant coach under Jim Gorman. Two years later, after Gorman's retirement, Fuller took over the position. Over the next 15 seasons Fuller built the Falcons into a powerhouse in their conference, winning multiple championships throughout the 90's. After a conference realignment in the late-90's, After the MASCAC began sponsoring ice hockey in 2009, Fuller led Fitchburg to a pair of conference titles as well as the program's first appearance in the NCAA Tournament.

When Fitchburg cancelled their 2020–21 season due to the COVID-19 pandemic, Fuller was 19th all-time with 561 wins.

Head Coaching Record

See also
List of college men's ice hockey coaches with 400 wins

References

External Links

Living people
American men's ice hockey forwards
Ice hockey people from Massachusetts
Fitchburg State University alumni
Year of birth missing (living people)